Collection Two or Collection 2 may refer to:

Collection Two, also published as More Stories by Frank O'Connor
Collection Two: 1965–66 Doctor Who missing episodes